Evenin' Blues is a studio album by blues vocalist Jimmy Witherspoon, recorded in 1963 and released on the Prestige label in March 1964.

Reception

AllMusic called the album "a good, relaxed (but not laid-back) session, and one of his bluesier ones".

Track listing 
All compositions by Jimmy Witherspoon except where noted.
 "Money's Gettin' Cheaper" - 2:49     
 "Grab Me a Freight" (Larraine Walton) - 3:45     
 "Don't Let Go" (Jesse Stone) - 2:49     
 "I've Been Treated Wrong" (Robert Brown) - 3:27     
 "Evenin'" (Royce Swain) - 2:42     
 "Cane River" - 2:33     
 "Baby, How Long" (Brownie McGhee) - 2:48     
 "Good Rockin' Tonight" (Roy Brown) - 2:43     
 "Kansas City" (Jerry Leiber, Mike Stoller) - 3:05
 "Drinkin' Beer" - 2:15     
 "Don't Let Go" [alternate take] (Stone) - 2:41 Bonus track on CD reissue     
 "I've Been Treated Wrong" [alternate take] (Brown) - 3:18 Bonus track on CD reissue     
 "Evenin'" [alternate take] (Swain) - 2:42 Bonus track on CD reissue     
 "Cane River" [alternate take] - 2:31 Bonus track on CD reissue

Personnel 
Jimmy Witherspoon - vocals
Clifford Scott - tenor saxophone, alto saxophone, flute
Bert Kendrix - piano, organ
T-Bone Walker - guitar
Clarence Jones - bass
Wayne Robertson - drums

References 

Jimmy Witherspoon albums
1964 albums
Prestige Records albums